Nevena is a feminine given name popular in South Slavic languages.

The name is the feminine form of the masculine name Neven, which means Calendula officinalis.

The name is composed of two parts Ne- (not) and -ven (from "venuti" - to fade, to wither) and can be translated roughly as "everlasting" or "never-fading".

Notable people with the name include:

 Nevena Božović (born 1994), Serbian singer
 Nevena Bridgen, British-Serbian opera singer and blogger
 Nevena Ignjatović (born 1990), Serbian alpine skier
 Nevena Jovanović (born 1990), Serbian basketball player
 Nevena Karanović (born 1961), Serbian politician
 Nevena Kokanova (1938–2008), Bulgarian film actress
 Nevena Lenđel (born 1979), Croatian high jumper
 Nevena Lipovac (born 1989), Serbian beauty pageant contestant
 Nevena Senior née Deleva (born 1959), Bulgarian English bridge player
 Nevena Tsoneva (born 1986), Bulgarian singer

See also 
 Nerves (film)

References

Given names
Feminine given names
Slavic feminine given names
Bulgarian feminine given names
Croatian feminine given names
Serbian feminine given names
Slovene feminine given names
Macedonian feminine given names
Montenegrin feminine given names
Ukrainian feminine given names